Kalmegha Union is a union of Sakhipur Upazila, Tangail District, Bangladesh. It was established in 2011.

See also
 Union Councils of Tangail District

References

 https://archive.today/20130423005525/http://kalmeghaup.tangail.gov.bd/node/735920
 https://archive.today/20130422212148/http://kalmeghaup.tangail.gov.bd/node/735924

Populated places in Dhaka Division
Populated places in Tangail District
Unions of Sakhipur Upazila